Over and Wharton railway station was one of three railway stations serving the town of Winsford in Cheshire. The station was the terminus of the Over and Wharton branch line, a short branch off the West Coast Main Line operated by the London and North Western Railway and later the London Midland and Scottish Railway and British Railways.

Decline and closure
Goods traffic survived nationalisation and the station remained open for mainly rock salt traffic until March 1991

Route

See also
Winsford railway station
Winsford and Over railway station

Notes

References

External links
Over & Wharton station on the Subterranea Britannica Disused Stations website

Disused railway stations in Cheshire
Former London and North Western Railway stations
Railway stations in Great Britain opened in 1882
Railway stations in Great Britain closed in 1917
Railway stations in Great Britain opened in 1920
Railway stations in Great Britain closed in 1947
Winsford